was a samurai commander, and later chinjufu-shōgun (Commander-in-chief of the defense of the North), during Japan's Nara period.

Karitomo's father was Sakanoue no Inukai.
 
In 764, Karitamaro aided in the repression of a revolt by Fujiwara no Nakamaro.

Karitomo's son was Tamuramaro, the first to hold the title Sei-i Taishōgun.

Notes

References
 Iwao, Seiichi. (2002).  Dictionnaire historique du Japon (with Teizō Iyanaga, Susumu Ishii, Shōichirō Yoshida et al.).  Paris: Maisonneuve & Larose. ;  OCLC 51096469
 Papinot, Edmond. (1910). Historical and geographical dictionary of Japan. Tokyo: Librarie Sansaisha.

External links
 Los Angeles County Museum:  "Sakanoue no Karitamaro Drawing His Bow" (1880), woodblock print by Tsukioka Yoshitoshi (1839–1892)

Samurai
728 births
786 deaths